Lowry Massif is a compact block of ridgelines without a prominent culminating summit, rising to about  on the south side of Byrd Glacier, Antarctica. A section of Shackleton Limestone was measured here by United States Antarctic Program geologist Edmund Stump on November 21, 2000. The massif is named after geologist Patrick H. Lowry, a member of Stump's Arizona State University field parties, 1977–78 and 1978–79, the latter season being in the Byrd Glacier area.

References

Mountains of Oates Land